Nina Ignatyeva (born 9 May 1948) is a Russian luger. She competed in the women's singles event at the 1972 Winter Olympics.

References

1948 births
Living people
Russian female lugers
Olympic lugers of the Soviet Union
Lugers at the 1972 Winter Olympics
Sportspeople from Saint Petersburg